Bulnesia is a genus of flowering plants in the caltrop family, Zygophyllaceae. The wood of some – particularly B. arborea and B. sarmientoi – is traded as verawood (colloquially "vera") or "lignum vitae". They are close relatives of the "true" lignum vitae trees of genus Guaiacum.

Species
 Bulnesia arborea – Maracaibo lignum vitae; 'True' Verawood
 Bulnesia bonariensis Griseb.
 Bulnesia carrapo Killip & Dugand
 Bulnesia chilensis Gay
 Bulnesia foliosa Griseb.
 Bulnesia loraniensis Griseb.
 Bulnesia macrocarpa Phil.
 Bulnesia rivas-martinezii G.Navarro
 Bulnesia retama (Gillies ex Hook. & Arn.) Griseb 
 Bulnesia sarmientoi – Argentine lignum vitae, Paraguay lignum vitae, "palo santo", ibiocaí
 Bulnesia schickendantzii Hieron.

References

External links

 
Rosid genera